The Diefenbaker Management Area is an area of Saskatoon, to the west of the Exhibition subdivision. The area includes Diefenbaker Park and the Nutana Pioneer Cemetery. The park includes a medium-sized hill which is used for tobogganing and snowboarding, and the park itself is a frequently-used venue for picnics and public events and performances.

History
The Pioneer Cemetery received its first interment in 1884. On June 20, 1905 the Nutana Cemetery Co was awarded a special grant at SW Section 20 Township 36 Range 5 W of the 3rd Meridian. The Pioneer Cemetery, located west of the intersection of Ruth Street and St. Henry Avenue, was also called the Nutana Cemetery, and was the first municipal cemetery for the City of Saskatoon until 1910 when Woodlawn Cemetery became the city cemetery. The Pioneer Cemetery was declared a heritage site in 1982.

The southern portion of Diefenbaker Park has been disrupted by the development nearby of the Circle Drive freeway extension, which removed a strip of the park and now places formerly quiet areas right next to freeway traffic.

In 2018, a large portion of the park, including its hill—now called Optimist Hill—entered a period of reconstruction and redevelopment that saw it reconfigured into a $3 million recreation facility with a ski hill, seasonal chalet and terrain park, with a toboggan hill to follow in 2020. The facility opened to the public in February 2019. Prior to the redevelopment, the public was allowed to drive to the top of the hill, where a parking lot allowed for a scenic view of the city.

Events and festivals
Diefenbaker park is home to Saskatoon's organized events on Canada Day, consisting of official ceremonies, live entertainment, various activities and nighttime fireworks.

Location
The Diefenbaker Management Area is located within the Nutana Suburban Development Area. It is bounded by the South Saskatchewan River to the west, St. Henry Avenue to the east, Ruth Street West to the north, and the city limits to the south. The only roads are St. Henry Avenue and the road looping through Diefenbaker Park.

References

External links

 Saskatoon Neighbourhoods Word Search Puzzle
 City of Saskatoon · Departments · Community Services · Community ... 
 City of Saskatoon · Departments · Community Services · City Planning · ZAM Maps
 Populace Spring 2006
 Sask Tourism We Are Many
 Sask Tourism We Are Many

Neighbourhoods in Saskatoon
Parks in Saskatchewan